Mitchell Arts Centre is in Stoke-on-Trent, England. Formerly known as the Mitchell Memorial Youth Theatre and Mitchell Memorial Youth Arts Centre and referred to locally as The Mitch. It was opened by Group-Captain Douglas Bader on 28 October 1957, 14 years after Lord Mayor Councillor Charles Austin Brook launched a public appeal in February 1943 with the support of Florence Mitchell, Reginald Mitchell's widow.

History
Charles Austin Brook was the lord mayor of Stoke-on-Trent between 1942 and 1943. He had, along with the whole of the country witnessed the Battle of Britain, the fight that took place in the skies against the German Luftwaffe in the summer of 1940. It was here that the Spitfire came into its own and on 12 October 1940 Hitler halted his invasion of Britain

It was while Brook was mayor of Stoke-on-Trent he suggested that the city should construct a building that would be a lasting memorial to Reginald Mitchell, the Stoke-on-Trent born designer of the Spitfire. The suggestion was greeted with great enthusiasm. Many suggestions were made, the most impressive from Mr J.F. Carr, the director of education, being to build a Youth Centre. Charles Austin Brook said of the appeal:

Initially the vision for the Youth Arts Centre was huge, the City wanted to raise £100,000 and building work was to commence immediately after the war. The plan was for the Youth Centre to have a games room, gym with full-sized boxing ring, photographic studios, and theatre as well as art and music rooms.

The Spitfire Mitchell Memorial Fund was launched nationwide in June 1944 in London. The fund had already raised £40,000 locally. In 1957 the Evening Sentinel Supplement stated that the fund's Executive Committee wanted to raise £250,000, £100,000 of this would be to build the Youth Centre and the rest of the money would be to enable the University of Southampton to endow scholarships to students studying at the School of Engineering. Despite the nationwide appeal, by 1953 the fund had reached £67,431. This was however viewed as a commendable amount considering the hardships of war time and the post-war years. £20,000 was put into the RJ Mitchell Endowment fund for the University of Southampton, this funding ceased but in 2006 scholarships in Mitchell's name have been funded from tuition fees.

Cartwright House

Adjoining the main theatre building is Cartwright House, which was for many years the home to the Hanley branch of the Workers Educational Association providing access to education for adults across the city.

Refurbishment

In April 2009 the Mitchell Memorial Youth Arts Centre closed to undergo a major £4.3 million refurbishment of the theatre facilities. The building re-opened in 2011.

References

External links 

 

Buildings and structures in Stoke-on-Trent
Monuments and memorials in Staffordshire
1957 establishments in England
Theatres in Staffordshire
Arts centres in England